Kvamsøy is a small island in Sogndal Municipality in Vestland county, Norway. The  island lies in the Sognefjorden, just off the coast of the village of Kvamme.

The island is notable because it is home to the historic Kvamsøy Church which was built around the year 1300. It was the centre of the Kvamsøy parish for hundreds of years, serving the southern part of the present-day Balestrand municipality.  The church was used until 1903 when it was closed down and replaced by the newly built Sæle Church, a short distance away on the mainland.

See also
List of islands of Norway

References

Islands of Vestland
Sogndal